Lindsay James Townsend  (3 March 1934 – 2 June 2020) was a New Zealand international rugby player. He was a member of the All Blacks in 1955, playing in the halfback position.

Early life
Townsend was born in Mataura, New Zealand, and was educated at Christian Brothers School, Dunedin, where he played rugby.

Senior rugby
Townsend played for the University club in 1953  and represented Otago in that year.  From 1954 until 1957 he played for the Southern club in Dunedin. He then shifted to the North Island and played for the Kamo club and represented North Auckland in 1958–1963. He represented the South Island in 1954–1956 and was a New Zealand trialist 1956–1959. He played in the New Zealand XV in 1954 and 1955 and also played for the rest of New Zealand in the same years.

All Black
Townsend was selected for the All Blacks in 1955. He played in Australia in the first and third tests and at home for New Zealand which were the only games he played for the All Blacks.

Death
Townsend died in Whangārei on 2 June 2020.

References

1934 births
2020 deaths
New Zealand international rugby union players
New Zealand rugby union players
People educated at Trinity Catholic College, Dunedin
People from Mataura
Otago rugby union players
Rugby union scrum-halves
Rugby union players from Southland, New Zealand